Charles Leblanc (born June 3, 1996) is a Canadian professional baseball Infielder in the Miami Marlins organization. He made his MLB debut in 2022.

Amateur career
Leblanc attended Georges Vanier Secondary School in Laval, Québec. He was drafted by the Milwaukee Brewers in the 33rd round of the 2013 MLB draft, but did not sign and instead attended the University of Pittsburgh to play college baseball for the Panthers. He hit .292 with 3 home runs and 30 RBI as a freshman in 2015. In 2016 he hit .405/.494/.513/1.006 with 2 home runs and 46 RBI, and was named First Team All-ACC . Leblanc was drafted by the Texas Rangers in the 4th round of the 2016 MLB draft and signed with them.

Professional career

Texas Rangers
He spent his professional debut season of 2016 with the Spokane Indians of the Class A Short Season Northwest League, hitting .285/.380/.386/.766 with 1 home run and 15 RBI. He split the 2017 season between Spokane and the Hickory Crawdads of the Class A South Atlantic League, hitting a combined .244/.314/.333/.647 with 4 home runs and 21 RBI. Leblanc spent the 2018 season with the Down East Wood Ducks of the Class A-Advanced Carolina League, hitting .274/.349/.412/.761 with 10 home runs and 72 RBI. After the 2018 season, he played for the Surprise Saguaros of the Arizona Fall League, hitting .292/.382/.354/.735 with 6 RBI. He spent the 2019 season with the Frisco RoughRiders of the Double-A Texas League, hitting .265/.329/.355/.684 with 7 home runs and 54 RBI. He did not play in 2020 due to the cancellation of the Minor League Baseball season because of the COVID-19 pandemic. He spent the 2021 season with the Round Rock Express of the Triple-A West, hitting .229/.313/.455/.768 with 17 home runs and 54 RBI.

Miami Marlins
Leblanc was selected by the Miami Marlins in the minor league phase of the 2021 Rule 5 draft. He opened the 2022 season with the Jacksonville Jumbo Shrimp. On July 29, 2022, Miami selected Leblanc's contract and called him up to the major leagues for the first time.

On January 4, 2023, Leblanc was designated for assignment by the Marlins after the signing of Jean Segura was made official.

See also
Rule 5 draft results

References

External links

Pitt Panthers bio

1996 births
Living people
Canadian expatriate baseball players in the United States
Sportspeople from Laval, Quebec
Baseball people from Quebec
Major League Baseball players from Canada
Major League Baseball infielders
Miami Marlins players
Pittsburgh Panthers baseball players
Spokane Indians players
Hickory Crawdads players
Down East Wood Ducks players
Surprise Saguaros players
Frisco RoughRiders players
Round Rock Express players
Jacksonville Jumbo Shrimp players
Canadian expatriate baseball players in the Dominican Republic
Tigres del Licey players